Abumumbazi Airport  is an airport serving the town of Abumumbazi, in the Nord-Ubangi Province of the Democratic Republic of the Congo. The runway is on the north side of the town.

See also

 Transport in the Democratic Republic of the Congo
 List of airports in the Democratic Republic of the Congo

References

External links
 OpenStreetMap - Abumumbazi Airport
 OurAirports - Abumumbazi Airport
 SkyVector -  Abumumbazi Airport
 HERE Maps - Abumumbazi
 

Airports in the Nord-Ubangi Province